Kent Williams (born December 27, 1950) is an American actor.

Williams was born in Harlem, Manhattan, New York. He studied music and theatre at the State University of New York at Oswego, where he graduated in the class of 1973. He is known for his role as an Assistant District Attorney and, later, Special Prosecutor Lawrence D. Barrington in the television programs Mickey Spillane's Mike Hammer, and The New Mike Hammer. Williams reunited with Stacy Keach in 1997 when a new Mike Hammer syndicated television show was released under the title Mike Hammer, Private Eye. This time Williams played the role of Deputy Mayor Barry Lawrence.

External links
 

1950 births
American male film actors
American male television actors
Living people
People from Manhattan
State University of New York at Oswego alumni